Machiloides is a genus of rock bristletails in the family Meinertellidae. There are at least two described species in Machiloides.

Species
 Machiloides banksi Silvestri, 1911
 Machiloides petauristes Wygodzinsky and Schmidt, 1980

References

Further reading

 

Insect genera
Archaeognatha